Teignbridge District Council in Devon, England is elected every four years. Since the last boundary changes in 2019, 47 councillors have been elected from 24 wards.

Political control
The first election to the council was held in 1973, initially operating as a shadow authority before coming into its powers on 1 April 1974. Political control of the council since 1973 has been held by the following parties:

Leadership
The leaders of the council since 2003 have been:

Council elections
1973 Teignbridge District Council election
1976 Teignbridge District Council election
1979 Teignbridge District Council election (New ward boundaries)
1983 Teignbridge District Council election
1987 Teignbridge District Council election (District boundary changes took place but the number of seats remained the same)
1991 Teignbridge District Council election (District boundary changes took place but the number of seats remained the same)
1995 Teignbridge District Council election
1999 Teignbridge District Council election
2003 Teignbridge District Council election (New ward boundaries reduced the number of seats by 12)
2007 Teignbridge District Council election
2011 Teignbridge District Council election (Some new ward boundaries)
2015 Teignbridge District Council election
2019 Teignbridge District Council election (New ward boundaries increasing number of seats by one to 47)

By-election results

1995-1999

1999-2003

2007-2011

2016-present

The by-election was triggered by the death of Conservative Party Councillor Geoff Bladen

The by-election was triggered by the death of Conservative Party Councillor Anna Klinkenberg

The by-election was triggered by the death of Conservative Party Councillor Patricia Johnson-King

References

By-election results

External links
Teignbridge District Council

 
Council elections in Devon
Teignbridge
District council elections in England